Franz Konrad (1 March 1906, Liesing – 6 March 1952, Warsaw) was an Austrian mid-level commander in the SS of Nazi Germany who was an administrative official responsible for the Werteerfassung or "recording of valuables" in the Warsaw Ghetto. He earned the nickname "the King of the Warsaw Ghetto". In March 1952, Konrad was executed by hanging in Warsaw.

Career
Franz Konrad was a son of a miner. After school, Konrad obtained a business degree. He worked with various export firms as bookkeeper. He soon "demonstrated his proclivity for criminal action when he was caught stealing money from his employer. Not only did he lose his job but he was also imprisoned for three months in 1932. Out of jail and out of work, Konrad drifted for a few weeks until his former defense lawyer helped him join the (then) illegal Austrian SS (number 46,204) in January 1933". Thereafter, he joined the Nazi party with membership number: 1,085,499. Konrad, a member of the Lebensborn, was married in 1931 and subsequently became the father of three children.

After 19 June 1933, Austria banned the Nazi party and Franz Konrad participated in the attempted coup in July 1934. Konrad was arrested and detained in Wöllersdorf-Steinabrückl. In July 1935, he fled to Nazi Germany and entered the SS camp in Weisshenfeld for military training as a member of the SS-Verfügungstruppe. He returned to Austria following the Anschluss in April 1938 as a full-time SS leader and administrative officer of the SS-section XXXV, Sturmbann III/94 (SS-Führer und Verwaltungsführer des SS-Abschnitts XXXV, Sturmbann III/94). In January 1939, Konrad was appointed SS-Untersturmführer.

In November 1939, after the outbreak of World War II, Franz Konrad was convened as a full-time administrative officer of the SS and SS-Oberscharführer der Waffen SS in Warsaw. In a further development in the management school at the 1st SS Division Leibstandarte SS Adolf Hitler, Konrad was responsible for the construction and establishment of accommodation for troops and also the acquisition of goods for these troops in Warsaw.

In June 1941, Franz Konrad was attached to Hermann Fegelein's cavalry and involved in Operation Barbarossa. In July 1941, he was promoted to the rank of SS-Obersturmführer. In July 1942 he returned to Warsaw and became an administrative manager for the acquisition of Jewish property and chattels in the Warsaw Ghetto where he earned the nickname "the King of the Warsaw Ghetto". This was under the direct supervision of SS and Police Leader (SS und Polizeiführer) in Warschau SS-Oberführer Ferdinand von Sammern-Frankenegg, who was responsible for the requisition, sorting and routing of Jewish assets, funds, equipment and machinery. In Warsaw he is "alleged to have kept the Polish aristocrat Countess Barbara Kalewska as his personal mistress."

On 1 April 1943 Konrad was reassigned to the SS and Police Leader (SS und Polizeiführer) in Lublin SS-Gruppenführer Odilo Globocnik and employed in the Ostindustrie GmbH. From there, he returned to SS and Police Leader (SS und Polizeiführer) in Warschau SS-Oberführer Ferdinand von Sammern-Frankenegg in the Warsaw Ghetto. During the 1943 Warsaw Ghetto uprising Konrad took part in the crackdown. In the rest of 1943 Konrad was busy with the review of the POW camp at Włodawa which was transformed into a labor camp. In addition he was involved with the acquisition of valuables in the Białystok Ghetto, and also the relocation of the machinery in the rest of the Warsaw Ghetto. At the end of 1943 Konrad finished his work for Ostindustrie GmbH and from 3 January 1944 onwards Franz Konard was employed as administrative head of the SS office in Schloss Fischhorn near Zell am See. In February 1944 he was promoted to SS-Hauptsturmführer. He is alleged to have maintained Martha von Broskowitz as both personal secretary and mistress there.

On 5 May 1945 Spacil met up with SS Hauptsturmführer Franz Konrad at the village of Mittensill near Taxenbach and gave him a substantial sum of Reichsbank currency. This was mostly money from the Berlin Reichsbank intended for some use after the war while some of the cash was apparently distributed loosely to senior Gestapo and SS officers in the vicinity to pay German soldiers their wages.

Postwar
After the war, Konrad was arrested and convicted in the trial of SS-Gruppenführer Jürgen Stroop for participating in the liquidation of the Warsaw ghetto. On 6 March 1952 Konrad was executed by hanging in Warsaw together with Stroop.

Dates of Rank
 January 1939 : SS-Untersturmführer
 November 1940 : SS-Oberscharführer der Waffen SS
 July 1941 : SS-Obersturmführer
 February 1944 : SS-Hauptsturmführer

References

Literature
 Joachim Jahns. Der Warschauer Ghettokönig. Dingsda-Verlag, Leipzig, 2009, .
 Ernst Klee. Das Personenlexikon zum Dritten Reich: Wer war was vor und nach 1945. Fischer-Taschenbuch-Verlag, Frankfurt am Main, 2007, .
 Josef Wulf. Das Dritte Reich und seine Vollstrecker – Die Liquidation von 500.000 Juden im Ghetto Warschau. Arani-Verlags GmbH, Berlin, 1961.
 Ian Sayer & Douglas Botting. Nazi Gold, Granada Publishing, 1984.
 Höhne, Heinz. Der Orden unter dem Totenkopf, (English translation entitled The Order of the Death's Head, The Story of Hitler's SS) London: Pan Books Ltd. 1969.
 Koehl, Robert Lewis. The Black Corps University of Wisconsin Press, 1983.
 Reitlinger, Gerald. The SS: Alibi of a Nation 1922–1945. Viking (Da Capo reprint), New York. 1957. 
 Kenneth A. Alford & Theodore P. Savas. Nazi Millionaires: The Allied Search for Hidden SS Gold. Casemate, 2002. 

1906 births
1952 deaths
People from Liesing
SS-Hauptsturmführer
Warsaw Ghetto
Holocaust perpetrators in Poland
Austrian people executed abroad
Executed Austrian Nazis
Nazis executed by Poland by hanging
Prisoners and detainees of Austria
Executed military personnel
Waffen-SS personnel
Stroop Report
Executed mass murderers